Deanna Jurius ( 1992) is a New Hampshire politician.

Jurius earned a B.S. Biblical studies and a M.Ed. in professional school counseling from Lancaster Bible College in 2016.

Jurius works as a guidance counselor and an upper school teacher at Laconia Christian Academy.

On November 6, 2018, Jurius was elected to the New Hampshire House of Representatives where she represents the Belknap 2 district. Jurius assumed office on December 5, 2018. Jurius is a Republican.

Jurius resides in Meredith, New Hampshire.

References

Living people
Women state legislators in New Hampshire
People from Meredith, New Hampshire
Republican Party members of the New Hampshire House of Representatives
21st-century American women politicians
21st-century American politicians
Year of birth missing (living people)